The 1959 Soviet Football Championship, Class B was the tenth season of the Soviet Class B football competitions since their establishment in 1950. It was also the nineteenth season of the Soviet second tier professional football competitions. 

It involved participation of 101 "teams of masters" split in seven groups which were composed by regional principle to some extent. Compared with the previous season, the number of participants was increased by seven teams. The teams were distributed somewhat equally among the seven groups with three groups containing 15 teams and four groups - 14. The competition also included representation of all 15 union republics by at least one participant. In majority the season kicked off on April 18, 1959, with the Round 1 matches in five groups. Groups 5 and 7 started later.

Four out of seven groups were won by clubs from the Russian SFSR (Russian Federation), three others represented three other union republics. Initially all the winners were to qualify for the final tournament as in previous season, but it was scratched as it was decided to reorganize competitions. The 1960 Class A competitions (higher tier) were planned to be expanded from 12 to 22 teams (by 10 teams). Among the four Russian winners there was organized additional short single round-robin tournament to identify the ultimate Class B winner for the Russian SFSR.

Following this season, the Soviet Class B competitions were split based on regional principle in three main groups Russian SFSR, Ukrainian SSR and Union republics.

Teams
Promoted to (14): Spartak Leningrad, Torpedo Vladimir, Trud Ryazan, Trud Tula, Spartak Nalchik, Arsenal Kiev, Avangard Zhitomir, Avangard Krivoi Rog, Avangard Ternopol, Shakhter Gorlovka, Lokomotiv Bendery, Lokomotiv Gomel, Lokomotiv Tbilisi, Tekstilschik Kirovobad

Relegated to (1): Admiralteyets Leningrad

First stage

I Zone

Number of teams by republics

II Zone

Number of teams by republics

III Zone

Number of teams by republics

IV Zone

Number of teams by republics

V Zone

Play-Off for 1st place 
 [in Rostov-na-Donu]
 Admiralteyets Leningrad  4-1 Volga Kalinin

Number of teams by republics

VI Zone

Number of teams by republics

VII Zone
 [All teams are from Russian Federation]

Play-Off for 1st place
 [in Rostov-na-Donu]
 SKVO Sverdlovsk  4-1 Lokomotiv Krasnoyarsk

Promotion

RSFSR
One team was to be promoted so all four group winners contested it in short tournament.
 [for Russian Federation]
 [Nov 6-10, Grozny]

Other union republics
 Ukraine
 FC Avangard Kharkov was promoted ahead of a group winner Lokomotiv Vinnitsa.
Belarus
 There was formed new team Belarus based on better players from all Class B teams.
Estonia
 The new team Kalev Tallinn promoted ahead of Dinamo Tallinn.
Latvia
 Daugava Riga gained direct promotion.
Lithuania
 Spartak Vilnius gained direct promotion.
Armenia
 Spartak Yerevan gained direct promotion.
Azerbaijan
 Neftyanik Baku gained promotion as a better team of the 1959 Class B.
Uzbekistan
 Pakhtakor Tashkent gained promotion as a better team of the 1959 Class B.
Kazakhstan
 Kairat Alma-Ata gained promotion as a better team of the 1959 Class B.

See also
 Soviet First League

External links
 1959 Soviet Championship and Cup
 1959 season at rsssf.com

Soviet First League seasons
2
Soviet
Soviet